Nathan Nance is an American sound engineer. He was nominated for an Academy Award in the category Best Sound for the film Mank. Nance has won a Primetime Emmy Award and been nominated for three more in the category Outstanding Sound Mixing for his work on the television program House of Cards. His win was shared with Lorenzo Millan and Scott R. Lewis.

Selected filmography 
 Mank (2020; co-nominated with Ren Klyce, Jeremy Molod, David Parker and Drew Kunin)

References

External links 

Living people
Place of birth missing (living people)
Year of birth missing (living people)
American audio engineers
21st-century American engineers
Primetime Emmy Award winners
Full Sail University alumni